Francis Stuart Low CBE (August 15, 1894 – January 22, 1964) was a decorated officer of the United States Navy with the rank of four-star Admiral. An expert in submarine warfare, Low is credited with the idea that twin-engined Army bombers could be launched from an aircraft carrier. This idea was later adopted for the planning of the Doolittle Raid.

Low distinguished himself as Chief of Staff, U.S. Tenth Fleet during the U-boat campaign in the Atlantic Ocean and completed his career in 1956 as Commander, Western Sea Frontier, and Commander Pacific Reserve Fleet.

Early career

Francis S. Low was born on August 15, 1894, in Albany, New York, as the son of late Commander William Franklin Low, USN, and Mrs. Anna (Stuart) Low. His family later moved to Newton, Massachusetts, and young Francis attended high school there. He subsequently received an appointment to the United States Naval Academy at Annapolis, Maryland, in summer of 1911. While at the Academy, Low was active in the swimming team and held record in 220-Yard swimming. He was nicknamed "Frog" by his classmates and graduated with Bachelor's degree in June 1915.

Some of his classmates also became distinguished general officers later: Arthur C. Davis, Lynde D. McCormick, Arthur D. Struble, Ralph W. Christie, John L. McCrea, Ralph J. Mitchell, Harvey Overesch, Pedro del Valle, Howard L. Vickery, Richard W. Bates, Henry P. Burnett, Archie F. Howard, DeWitt Peck, Oliver H. Ritchie, James M. Shoemaker, Scott Umsted and Raymond R. Wright.

Low was commissioned ensign at the time of his graduation and attached to the battleship  and later was transferred to the heavy cruiser . While aboard that ship, he participated in the Veracruz Expedition and Haitian Campaign.

Following his first sea duties, he was then attached to the submarine  and began training as submariner at Naval Submarine Base New London, Connecticut. After six months of training, Low was attached to the  under the command of lieutenant j.g. Robert H. English and participated as his deputy in the coastal patrols and protection of the Atlantic coast from U-boats. She departed Newport November 2, 1918, for European waters, but the termination of hostilities brought the submarine back to the United States.

Interwar period

Low assumed command of newly commissioned  at the end of April 1923 and sailed to Guantanamo, Cuba and then via the Panama Canal to Hawaii. He departed S-12 in summer of 1925 in order to attend the junior course at the Naval War College at Newport, Rhode Island. Following his graduation one year later, Low was appointed an instructor in the Department of Seamanship at the Naval Academy at Annapolis, Maryland. He was then attached to the battleship  and participated in the training exercises in the Atlantic and the Pacific oceans.

He was appointed officer in charge of the Recruiters' Training School, Naval Station, Hampton Roads, Virginia in 1929 and served in this capacity until the summer of 1932. Low was then attached to the Staff, Submarine Squadron 5 for a brief period and subsequently assumed command of destroyer  in June 1932. He commanded that ship during the Yangtze River Patrol and then took part in the patrol along the China coast, while making occasional voyages to and from Manila.

Low returned to the United States in March 1934 and assumed duty in the Bureau of Navigation, before he was later transferred to the Office of the Chief of Naval Operations under Admiral William H. Standley. He returned to the sea in summer of 1937, when he was appointed Commander of Submarine Squadron 13 and held this command the Neutrality Patrol in 1939.

World War II

Low returned to Washington, D.C. in December 1940 and served again in the Office of the Chief of Naval Operations under Admiral Harold R. Stark. Following the appointment of Admiral Ernest J. King as new Chief of Naval Operations in March 1942, Low remained in his office and assumed duty as Operations Officer with additional duty as Assistant Chief of Staff for antisubmarine warfare.

Following the Japanese Attack on Pearl Harbor on December 7, 1941, Low came up with the idea that twin-engined Army bombers could be launched from an aircraft carrier, after observing several at a naval airfield in Norfolk, Virginia, where the runway was painted with the outline of a carrier deck for landing practice. Low sold the idea to Admiral King, who respected Low's opinion and forwarded it to the chief of the Army Air Forces, General Henry H. Arnold, who supported the plan. The operations later became known as the Doolittle Raid, the first air operation to strike the Japanese Home Islands. It demonstrated that the Japanese mainland was vulnerable to American air attack, served as retaliation for the Japanese attack on Pearl Harbor, and provided an important boost to American morale.

Low remained in this capacity until the beginning of September 1942 and assumed Navy Commendation Medal for his service in Washington. He was subsequently ordered to New York Navy Yard and assumed command of the heavy cruiser , which was stationed there for repairs. Low led his vessel during the training off the Virginia Capes for the rest of the month, after which she steamed to Casco Bay in Maine for further maneuvers.

Wichita participated in the Naval Battle of Casablanca within the Operation Torch, an Anglo–American invasion of French North Africa, during November 1942 and helped neutralize the primary French defenses, which included coastal guns on El Hank, several submarines, and the incomplete battleship  which lay at anchor in the harbor. Wichita was damaged and after series of patrols between Casablanca and Fedhala, she departed for New York for repairs on November 16. Low received Bronze Star Medal with Combat "V" for his service in North African waters.

Low subsequently commanded his vessel to the Pacific theater and participated in the Battle of Rennell Island in January 1943, before he was recalled to Washington, D.C. on March 10, 1943. After brief stint in Washington, D.C., he was promoted to the rank of Rear Admiral on April 6, 1943, and appointed Chief of Staff of newly established U.S. Tenth Fleet under his old superior, Admiral Ernest J. King, who delegated the authority to command Tenth Fleet to Low. The Tenth Fleet was established as the result of negotiations between Britain, Canada and the United States in order to intercept U-boat operations against the merchant convoys and other allied vessels. It had no battleships, no carriers, no cruisers, no destroyers. Only desks, plotting boards and laboratories. Its personnel numbered less than 500, all landlubbers and half of them scientists. The radio operators and radio directions finders drew attention of German submarines and although the Tenth Fleet did not sink any enemy submarines, it forwarded the reports of enemy activity to the U.S. Atlantic Fleet, Royal Navy and Royal Canadian Navy.

Admiral Low was responsible for the day-to-day operations of the Tenth Fleet and also maintained the liaison with the General Staff of the United States Army, the British Admiralty and the Canadian Naval Headquarters to insure maximum efficiency in combined operations. He coordinated and directed the activities of Allied anti-submarine forces as they systematically tracked down and destroyed German undersea marauders ranging the vast reaches of the Atlantic. Low was also responsible for the protection of Allied shipping in the Eastern, Gulf and Caribbean Sea Frontiers, exercised close control over all convoys under United States cognizance.

He remained in this capacity until January 1945, when he was replaced by Rear Admiral Allan R. McCann and ordered to the Pacific theater. For his service with Tenth Fleet, Low was decorated with the Navy Distinguished Service Medal. He was also appointed Commander of the Order of the British Empire.

He was later decorated with the Legion of Merit with Combat "V" for his service during that campaigns. He then led his command during the combat operations off the coasts off the Philippines and received Philippine Legion of Honor, rank Commander.

Later career

Following the end of War, Low was in charge of the surrender and neutralization of all Japanese Naval installations in Korea until November 1945, when he was appointed Commander, Destroyers Pacific Fleet. Low remained in this capacity until March 1947, when he assumed command of Service Forces, Pacific. He was also promoted to the rank of Vice Admiral at that date.

Low was ordered to the Navy Department in November 1949 to conduct a special survey of the Navy's anti-submarine program, and in February 1950 was designated Deputy Chief of Naval Operations for Logistics. He was responsible for the planning of budget for logistics for all marine forces and its advocating before the congressional committee on appropriations until May 1953, when he became Commander, Western Sea Frontier, and Commander Pacific Reserve Fleet.

Upon relieving by Rear Admiral John R. Redman, he retired after 41 years of active service on July 1, 1956, and was advanced to the rank of four-star Admiral on the retired list for having been specially commended in combat. Low was decorated with Legion of Honour by France and Order of Merit of the Italian Republic as the token of good will.

Retirement

Upon his retirement from the Navy, Low settled in Oakland, California, where he died on January 22, 1964, at Naval Hospital Oakland and is buried there at Mountain View Cemetery. He was survived by his second wife, Alice Regua Filmer Low (1900-1982).

Decorations

Here is the ribbon bar of Admiral Francis S. Low:

See also
Western Sea Frontier
List of United States Navy four-star admirals

References

1894 births
1964 deaths
People from Albany, New York
United States Naval Academy alumni
Naval War College alumni
United States Navy admirals
United States submarine commanders
United States Navy personnel of World War I
United States Navy World War II admirals
Recipients of the Navy Distinguished Service Medal
Recipients of the Legion of Merit
Commanders of the Order of the British Empire
Commandeurs of the Légion d'honneur
Recipients of the Order of Merit of the Italian Republic